Jerusalem: The Biography is a 2011 bestselling non-fiction book by British popular historian and writer Simon Sebag Montefiore.

Synopsis

Drawing on new archives, current scholarship, his own family papers and a lifetime's study, Montefiore illustrates the essence of sanctity and mysticism, identity and empire in a historical chronicle of the city of Jerusalem.

Montefiore chose to organize Jerusalem chronologically, stretching it from King David's establishment of the city as his capital to the 1967 Six-Day War, with an epilogue pondering on more recent events. In the introduction, the author explains that "it is only by chronological narrative that one avoids the temptation to see the past through the obsessions of the present."

The author narrates the history of Jerusalem as the centre of world history, but does not intend the book as an encyclopaedia of every aspect of this ancient city, nor as a guidebook of every niche, capital and archway in every building. At the beginning of his book, Montefiore clearly explains that neither does he intend to provide a history of Judaism, Christianity or Islam, nor a study of the nature of God in Jerusalem: for these he remands elsewhere, to a plethora of other publications. His task, Montefiore affirms, is to pursue the facts, not to adjudicate between the mysteries of different religions or the secular reasons behind historical events: Jerusalem is a synthesis based on a wide reading of the primary sources, ancient and modern, on personal seminars with specialists, professors, archaeologists, families and statesmen, and on the author's multiple visits to Jerusalem, the shrines and archaeological digs.

In December 2011, Simon Sebag Montefiore presented on BBC Four a three-part history of Jerusalem, based on his book and by the title Jerusalem: The Making of a Holy City.

Awards 

 2011: National Jewish Book Award for Jewish Book of the Year

See also

Walls of Jerusalem
Jerusalem Day (Yom Yerushalayim)
List of places in Jerusalem

References

External links
Book's Presentation, on author's official website.
Sources and notes for the book
BBC TV Presentation of Jerusalem, video news dated 28 January 2011.
Review on The Press, 10 March 2012
Bill Clinton's Video, celebrating Jerusalem as Best 2011 Book, on Today.com. Retrieved 29 October 2012
Interview with Montefiore, on YouTube. Retrieved 29 October 2012
Interview with Montefiore, on Current Affairs by Charlie Rose. Retrieved 29 October 2012
Discussion of Jerusalem at Politics and Prose Bookstore, Washington D.C., 2 November 2011

2011 non-fiction books
History of Jerusalem
Weidenfeld & Nicolson books
Books about Jerusalem